William Towse (ca. 1551 – 22 October 1634) was an English lawyer and politician who sat in the House of Commons at various times between 1586 and 1626.

Towse was from Hingham, Norfolk. He was admitted at Inner Temple in 1571 and was called to the bar.  He lived in the Inner Temple until 1614 and audited the steward's accounts and the treasurer's accounts five times between 1583 and 1600 and served on several committees investigating matters of concern to the inn. In 1586, he was elected Member of Parliament for Bramber. He was a J.P. for Essex from about 1592. In 1595 he became bencher of Inner Temple and in 1597 was summer reader.  He was treasurer of the Inn in 1607 and was Lent reader in 1610. In 1614 he became serjeant-at-law and was elected MP for Beverley. He was town clerk of  Colchester by 1620 and in his later years lived at Takeley, Essex. In 1621 he was elected MP for Colchester. He was re-elected MP for Colchester in 1624, 1625 and 1626. 
 
Towse died at the age of about 83.

Towse married Jean French and had a son and three daughters.

References

1550s births
1634 deaths
People from Takeley
People from Hingham, Norfolk
Members of the Inner Temple
English MPs 1586–1587
English MPs 1614
English MPs 1621–1622
English MPs 1624–1625
English MPs 1625
English MPs 1626